This was the first edition of the tournament. 

Anett Kontaveit won the title, defeating Simona Halep in the final, 6–2, 6–3. Kontaveit won the title without dropping a set. By winning the title, Kontaveit qualified for the WTA Finals, overtaking Ons Jabeur in the Race to Guadalajara, and also entered the top 10 of the WTA rankings for the first time. Her win over Halep in the final also marked her first victory over the former world No. 1.

Halep reached the final losing just 12 games. Her loss snapped a 14 match win streak on home soil.

Seeds

Draw

Finals

Top half

Bottom half

Qualifying

Seeds

Qualifiers

Lucky loser

Qualifying draw

First qualifier

Second qualifier

Third qualifier

Fourth qualifier

Fifth qualifier

Sixth qualifier

References

External Links
Main Draw
 Qualifying Draw

Transylvania Open - Singles